Salvador Sobrino (born 16 June 1959) is a Mexican diver. He competed in the men's 10 metre platform event at the 1980 Summer Olympics.

References

1959 births
Living people
Mexican male divers
Olympic divers of Mexico
Divers at the 1980 Summer Olympics
Place of birth missing (living people)